Royal Blood are an English rock duo formed in Worthing in 2011. The current lineup consists of Mike Kerr (vocals, bass) and Ben Thatcher (drums). They were signed by Warner Chappell Music in 2013 and have since released three studio albums: Royal Blood (2014), How Did We Get So Dark? (2017), and Typhoons (2021).

History

2011–2015: Formation and debut album

Royal Blood consists of vocalist and bassist Mike Kerr (born 19 June 1990) from Worthing and drummer Ben Thatcher (born 12 February 1988) from Rustington. They first met around 2005 when they were teenagers; for a brief period, they were part of the same four-piece band called Flavour Country, for which Kerr was the keyboardist and keytarist.

Royal Blood formed in Worthing in March 2011, after Kerr met original drummer Matt Swan. The band were initially a trio consisting of Kerr on vocals and bass, Joe Dennis on guitar, and Matt Swan on drums. Dennis left in early 2012, leading the band to discover what is now their signature sound, as Kerr's unique bass playing style (which sees him using various effects pedals and amps to make his bass guitar sound like an electric guitar and bass guitar at the same time) became the main focus. They relocated to Swan's home country of Australia, where they recorded an EP in Brisbane. The first single, "Leaving", premiered on Australian radio station Triple J in 2012; Kerr and Thatcher later recorded a new version of the song and renamed it "Come On Over". Kerr and Swan played around the Brisbane and Gold Coast area, before Kerr eventually decided to return to Worthing, ending this incarnation of the band. He was picked up at the airport by Thatcher, and the two decided to continue under the Royal Blood name together with Thatcher replacing Swan on drums.

Initially, the new duo "couldn't get a gig in Worthing for months" and "ended up just playing a lot of open-mic nights with acoustic singer-songwriters". The band developed their music in the studios of Brighton Electric, and it was during this time that they were signed by Warner Chappell Music. They joined the same management company as the band Arctic Monkeys. In 2013, Arctic Monkeys' drummer Matt Helders was seen wearing a Royal Blood shirt during Arctic Monkeys' performance at Glastonbury Festival, boosting interest in the band.

On 11 November 2013, Royal Blood released their official debut single, "Out of the Black", which came with the B-side of the re-recorded "Come On Over". In November 2013, it was announced that Royal Blood would be supporting Arctic Monkeys for two Finsbury Park shows in May 2014. In December 2013, Royal Blood were nominated for BBC Sound of 2014. Royal Blood released their second single, "Little Monster", on 11 February 2014. The band also released a four-track EP Out of the Black, featuring "Out of the Black", "Little Monster", "Come On Over" and "Hole" on 11 March 2014 in North America.

Royal Blood performed at South by Southwest in Austin, Texas in March 2014; at Liverpool Sound City festival and at BBC Radio 1's Big Weekend in Glasgow in May; and at Download Festival and Glastonbury Festival in June. They performed at Rock Werchter and T in the Park festival in July, and at Reading Festival, but got cut short at their Leeds Festival show, as well as Osheaga in August 2014.

Their debut album, Royal Blood, was released on 25 August 2014 on Warner Bros. Records. Well received by critics, it was verified by the Official Charts Company as the fastest-selling British rock debut album in three years in the UK. The cover artwork, by London-based contemporary artist Dan Hillier, won the Best Art Vinyl award in 2014. A video clip for "Out of the Black" entered rotation as part of cable network AXN Japan's "AXN Tunes" programme in October 2014; music videos aired on-the-hour as filler, in between their regularly scheduled timetabled programming.

In October 2014, Royal Blood announced details of their biggest European tour to date, starting in Germany on 10 January, and ending in Sweden on 23 March. The band, along with Iggy Pop, supported Foo Fighters on selected dates during their 2015 UK, US and Canada tours. In February 2015, at the Brit Awards in London, Jimmy Page presented them with the Best British Group Award. In April 2015, they played the Coachella Festival in California, in June 2015 they played twice at Rock Werchter and at Bunbury Music Festival in Cincinnati and, in September 2015, they played at the Rock in Rio festival, in Rio de Janeiro.

On 29 and 30 August 2015, Royal Blood played the main stage at Reading and Leeds 2015. During both of these performances, the band revealed a new song titled "Hook, Line & Sinker". In October 2015, the band had finished touring for their debut album. The song "Careless" is used as the opening theme of the French version of the TV show Tattoo Fixers.

2016–2018: How Did We Get So Dark?
On 29 March 2016, the band released a new track, "Where Are You Now?" inspired by the American TV series Vinyl. The song was later re-recorded during the making of their second album How Did We Get So Dark?

On 16 October 2016, a video was uploaded to the band's official Instagram account showing the band in the studio. The video showed Mike Kerr playing the Robbie Williams track "Let Me Entertain You" on piano, with Ben Thatcher recording the video and singing. The video was captioned "Day 1. Robbie Williams #royalblooddocovers". They then continued these short covers on Instagram, covering songs from Vanessa Carlton, Gloria Gaynor, Spandau Ballet, Elton John, Coldplay, and Michael Jackson.

Following its announcement on 11 April 2017, Royal Blood released their second album, How Did We Get So Dark? on 16 June 2017, preceded by the singles "Lights Out", "Hook, Line & Sinker" and "I Only Lie When I Love You." It debuted at number one on the UK Albums Chart. Royal Blood were part of the WayHome Music & Arts Festival 2017 Line-up in Oro-Medonte, Ontario. In April 2017, Royal Blood announced four UK shows, starting in Cambridge on 17 May and ending in Leicester on 20 May. In June 2017, Royal Blood played at Glastonbury on the Pyramid Stage. In addition, on 5 June, the band announced a tour in Europe on their social media, which took place throughout October and November 2017. In May 2018, Royal Blood went on a headlining US tour in continued support of their second album, which included more acts alongside Queens of the Stone Age.

2019–present: Typhoons
In June 2019, Kerr and Thatcher presented Jimmy Page with the Icon Award at the Kerrang! Awards. The following month, Royal Blood debuted two new songs, "Boilermaker" and "King", in Wiesbaden, Germany. In March 2020, the band announced they had begun recording their third studio album, though production was delayed due to the COVID-19 pandemic. On 24 September 2020, the band released "Trouble's Coming", the first single from their third studio album Typhoons. In October 2020, the single was featured as a part of both the NHL 21 and FIFA 21 soundtracks.

On 21 January 2021, the second single "Typhoons" was released, along with the announcement of the album itself, which was released on 30 April 2021 and features the previously previewed track "Boilermaker". Royal Blood contributed a cover of the Metallica song "Sad But True" to the charity tribute album The Metallica Blacklist, released in September 2021. On 18 March 2022, the band surprise released a new single, "Honeybrains".

Band members

 Mike Kerr – vocals, bass guitar, keyboards, piano (2011–present)
 Ben Thatcher – drums, percussion, piano (2013–present)

Former members
 Matt Swan – drums, percussion (2011–2013)
 Joe Dennis – guitar (2011–2012)

Current touring members
 Darren James – keyboards, backing vocals (2021–present)

Former touring members
 Jodie Scantlebury – backing vocals, electronic drums (2017–2018, 2020–2022)
 Zarif Davidson – backing vocals, electronic drums (2017–2018, 2020–2022)

Timeline

Discography

Royal Blood (2014)
How Did We Get So Dark? (2017)
Typhoons (2021)

Awards and nominations

References

External links
 

Mike Kerr interview on MusicRadar

Musical groups established in 2011
2011 establishments in England
Brit Award winners
NME Awards winners
Kerrang! Awards winners
English musical duos
English blues rock musical groups
Rock music duos
Musical groups from Brighton and Hove
Warner Records artists
English stoner rock musical groups
Male musical duos